Sahlabad (also Romanized as Sahlābād) is a village in Kaghazkonan-e Shomali Rural District, Kaghazkonan District, Meyaneh County, East Azerbaijan Province, Iran. In the 2006 census, its population was 107 people across 41 families.

References 

Populated places in Meyaneh County